Panida Khamsri (born January 13, 1989) is a Thai weightlifter.

Results

References

External links
the-sports.org

1989 births
Living people
Panida Khamsri
Weightlifters at the 2012 Summer Olympics
Panida Khamsri
Weightlifters at the 2014 Asian Games
World Weightlifting Championships medalists
Panida Khamsri
Universiade medalists in weightlifting
Panida Khamsri
Panida Khamsri
Southeast Asian Games medalists in weightlifting
Competitors at the 2011 Southeast Asian Games
Universiade bronze medalists for Thailand
Panida Khamsri
Medalists at the 2013 Summer Universiade
Panida Khamsri